Call It Courage (published as The Boy Who Was Afraid in the United Kingdom) is a 1940 children's novel written and illustrated by American author Armstrong Sperry. The novel won the Newbery Medal for excellence in American children's literature in 1941.

Plot / summary

The book Call It Courage is a novel of 116 pages. It is about a boy who tries to overcome his fear of the sea.

Call It Courage is a story set in the Pacific Islands.  It chronicles the journey of Mafatu, the son of the chief of Hikueru Island, Tavana Nui.  Mafatu is afraid of the sea due to witnessing his mother die while he was a young child, which makes him a shame to his father, and referred to as a coward among his tribe. Mafatu takes a dugout canoe and sets sail into the ocean without knowing where he will end up.  He is caught in a storm and the canoe is lost.  He lands on a deserted island and learns to hunt and fish for himself, along with his companions Uri, a small yellow dog, and Kivi, an albatross.

Soon Mafatu finds a sacrificial altar built by cannibals from a neighboring island. Mafatu realizes he has inhabited the island for about a week and begins designing his escape by making a canoe. He gathers things he will need to survive a trip across the ocean. He finds a spearhead on the terrible altar and, after attaching it to a shaft, uses it for hunting and defense.

After a number of encounters with natural foes, including a hammerhead shark, a wild boar, and an octopus, all of which he successfully kills, this is when he realizes he is gaining courage and learning to deal with the things that have frightened him.  The cannibals return and he makes a daring escape from them, returning home at last to his village.  The experience has transformed him into an imposing figure. His father does not recognize him at first, but then he proudly accepts him on his return. Mafatu's story is told throughout the ages to the future generations by his tribe's people. The book has five chapters and 92 readable pages.

Publications
The book was originally published in 1940 and has had numerous printings since then, and has been translated into many languages, including:
Afrikaans - Die seun wat bang was
Spanish - Estos es coraje
French - Le Garçon qui avait peur
German - Mafatu heißt "Starkes Herz"
Dutch - Mafatu: een jongen die moed had
Finnish
Swedish - Kalla det mod
Norwegian
Persian
Mandarin Chinese - Dahai de haizi
Japanese
Samoan - Alaga ia, o le lototele!, translated by Fanaafi Ma`ia`i Larkin, 1965.
Hindi
Turkish
Indonesian
Arabic
Hebrew
Urdu
Braille
Portuguese - Mafatu o menino destemido

Film

Call it Courage was filmed for television with a teleplay by Benjamin Masselink and a narration by Don Ho, and appeared on The Wonderful World of Disney for the first time on 1 April 1973 (Season 19, Episode 20).

Cast
Don Ho as Narrator
Evan Temarii as Mafatu

Production
Filmed on location in 1972 on the islands of Bora Bora and Tahiti using local actors speaking in their native dialect. It was directed by Roy Disney.

Other media

Musical play
A musical version of Call It Courage was performed between 9 April 2010 and 8 May 2010 by Zachary Scott Showstoppers. The music and lyrics for the production were by Adam Overett, and it was directed and choreographed by Adam Roberts. The Associate Director for the musical was Jaclyn Loewenstein.

References

External links

1940 American novels
American children's novels
Newbery Medal–winning works
Macmillan Publishers books
Novels set in Oceania
Novels set on islands
French Polynesia in fiction
American novels adapted into films
1940 children's books